The Argentine Naval Aviation (COAN) is the naval aviation branch of the Argentine Navy and one of its four operational commands. Argentina, along with Brazil is one of two South American countries to have operated two aircraft carriers

The acronym CANA is often used in English language bibliographies, but is not correct Spanish usage.

History

Formation and World Wars

COAN's origin can be traced to 22 October 1912 when a navy officer, Lt Melchor Escola, graduated as a pilot. On 11 February 1916 the naval air station school Fuerte Barragan was created near La Plata and the anniversary of this is marked as Naval Aviation Day. In September 1917 three naval lieutenants were sent to the US Naval Air Station Pensacola from which they were subsequently deployed to Europe to participate in World War I. 

COAN was officially established on 17 October 1919 as the Naval Air Service. Over the following years, the COAN operated a variety of aircraft, mainly advanced trainer types imported from the USA including the North American AT-6, the Beechcraft AT-11 and the Consolidated PBY Catalina. Sikorsky S-51 helicopters joined the service shortly after the war in 1949.

Early combat operations
The COAN received a baptism by fire on 16 June 1955 when naval airplanes took part in the bombing of Plaza de Mayo. Three aircraft were shot down: one by an Argentine Air Force Gloster Meteor in air-to-air combat and two others by anti-aircraft guns. A Grumman J2F was shot down over the town of Saavedra on 18 September that year.

Navy pilots would see combat again during 1962–63 internal military fighting between factions known as Azules y colorados (blue and reds), culminating in the 1963 Argentine Navy Revolt in which Navy F9F Panthers and F4U Corsairs bombed Argentine Army tanks in defense of the Navy base of Punta Indio.

A carrier navy

A great change came into effect when the Navy received its first aircraft carrier, in 1959. At the time, her aircraft inventory included the F4U Corsair, SNJ-5Cs Texan and Grumman S2F-1 (S-2A) Trackers. The Navy also had F9F Panther and F9F Cougar jets but the carrier was not suitable for operating them, although they were embarked on the carrier during their delivery voyage from the United States to Argentina. The Cougar was the first jet to break the sound barrier in Argentina. These jets would be involved in the general mobilization during the 1965 border dispute between Argentina and Chile but no combat occurred.

The naval training force received T-28 Trojans, T-34 Mentors and Aermacchi MB-326 jets which would be later reinforced with the most powerful variant MB-339.

In 1972 aircraft changed the word Naval to Armada painted on thempictorial

More aircraft entered service during the 1960s, including the C-47 Dakota (which were extensively used in Antarctica including the first national landing on the South Pole made in 1962 by Captain Hermes Quijada who departed from Ellsworth Station), Sikorsky S-55 helicopters and shore based aircraft P-2 Neptunes for maritime patrol duties.

In 1969 the Navy received her second carrier, ARA 25 de Mayo, from the Netherlands. On her voyage home, the British company Hawker Siddeley demonstrated its Harrier GR1 but the Argentines opted for the A-4Q Skyhawk instead. More helicopters were incorporated into the new carrier, the Alouette III and the SH-3 Sea King (the more advanced S-2E Tracker variant). Cargo planes Fokker F-28 and L-188 Electra modified for maritime patrol were also added.

The 1970s surface fleet modernization plan included the purchase of British destroyers with their complement of Westland Sea Lynx helicopters but their use would be affected by the upcoming events.

The military junta
In 1976, a Military Junta took power in Argentina and initiated a state-sponsored campaign of violence known as the Dirty War. Naval aviators were used to toss political prisoners (the "disappeared") into the River Plate, in the infamous Death flights. In 1978, tension with Chile reached the highest point when the Argentine junta initiated Operation Soberanía. The war was avoided at the last minute by the intervention of pope John Paul II. By 1982, in order to  maintain power by diverting public attention from the nation's poor economic performance and exploiting the long-standing feelings of the Argentines towards the Falkland Islands the Junta ordered an invasion and triggered the ten-week-long Falklands War.

Falklands War

The naval aviation, suffering an arms embargo since 1978 by US President Jimmy Carter for human rights abuses, was in the middle of the process of replacing their A-4Q Skyhawks with French-built Dassault-Breguet Super Étendards. The planes used AM39 Exocet anti-shipping missiles, also purchased from France, to sink the Royal Navy's  and the support ship . The older A-4Qs also had a role, destroying .

On the eve of war the Argentine carrier  attempted to launch a wave of A-4Q Skyhawk jets against the Royal Navy Task Force after her S-2 Trackers detected the British fleet. However, what might have been the first battle between aircraft carriers since World War II did not occur, as poor winds prevented the heavily loaded jets from taking off. After the British nuclear-powered submarine  sank the cruiser , the carrier returned to port for safety and her Skyhawks began their attacks from mainland Argentina instead.

Navy's T-34s and MB-339s, along with Air Force's Pucarás, were the only combat aircraft based on the islands and an MB-339 was the first aircraft to engage the British landing force during the Battle of San Carlos.

During the war the last two SP-2H Neptunes were retired due to airframe attrition and replaced with two leased Brazilian EMB 111 Bandeirantes.

Four naval aviators died in the war. Fourteen aircraft were lost, to various causes.

Post war 

In 1983, democracy was restored in Argentina and despite stricter military budgets, COAN was able to modernize with the lifting of arms embargoes. P-3 Orions and modified Beechcraft Super King Air were incorporated and Eurocopter Fennecs were bought as the new surface fleet embarked helicopter. New-built Agusta SH-3 Sea Kings for Antarctica arrived and UH-1H helicopters were assigned to the naval aviation to support the Argentine Marines. The navy also received Brazilian MB-326 Xavantes to replace their lost MB-339s.

The 1980s saw the last deployments of ARA 25 de Mayo: the Dassault-Breguet Super Étendards and the Israeli upgraded S-2T Turbo Trackers performed qualifications on her until the ship's final retirement.Video

Argentina was the only South American country to send warships, including embarked Alouette IIIs and cargo planes to the 1991 Gulf War under UN mandate. In 1998, Argentina was granted Major Non-NATO ally status by United States President Bill Clinton.

Present day 
Since 2001, due to the lack of an aircraft carrier, pilot qualification tests took place on the Brazilian Navy carrier  and/or touch-and-go landings on US Navy carriers when they are in transit within Argentine coastal waters for Gringo-Gaucho manoeuvres.

On 2008 the United States transferred four Sea King helicopters to replace the two lost in the fire of the icebreaker .  a lack of funds for training and maintenance has left the Navy in poor condition. In particular their aircraft are dependent on a steady supply of foreign-made spares, which has been reduced by currency controls and import restrictions – for example the Fokker F-28 transports are grounded because of spares getting stuck in customs.

Argentina hoped to upgrade ten of its eleven remaining Super Étendard to the latest Super Étendard Modernisé (SEM) standard using equipment from aircraft retired by France. This is now in doubt since their retirement from French service has been put back to late 2016 and relations with France have cooled since the UK intervened to block the sale of Spanish Mirage F1s to the Argentine Air Force. Five refurbished Super Etendard aircraft were finally delivered to the Navy from France in 2019. However, these aircraft await the delivery of key spare parts and, as reported in June 2020, may not be in operational service for a further two years. In 2021 it was reported that the return of these aircraft to an operational configuration was also encountering problems based on the fact that the ejector seats of the aircraft were the MK6, manufactured by Martin Baker in the UK. In early 2022, it was reported that the spare parts problem remained unresolved and the aircraft remained in storage. As of the end of 2022, a potential solution to the problem of operationalizing the ejection seat system on the aircraft was being explored with the American company Task Aerospace. However, no decision had been taken as to whether the proposed solution would be pursued.

Argentina was working on a procurement of four P-3C Orion aircraft from US Navy surplus stocks. Argentina's current fleet of P-3B's are non operational. The package deal was approved in September 2019. The US State Department has cleared the transaction of $78.03m to be carried out as part of a foreign military sale. It includes the delivery of related equipment and services. Argentina was to receive four turboprop engines for the aircraft and an additional four turboprop engines. It was also to receive communications and radar equipment, Infrared/Electro-optic equipment, and aviation life support systems. The US was to provide spares plus repairs, aircraft depot maintenance, and logistical support. Contractors for the deal include Logistic Services International, Lockheed Martin, Rockwell Collins and Eagle Systems. These newer Orions were to be up to the latest Orion standard, and provide Argentina with a much needed boost in anti-submarine and maritime surveillance missions. However, in the aftermath of the inauguration of Alberto Fernández as president in December 2019, the deal was cancelled with the Navy instead being compelled to refurbish its older P-3B fleet. In 2021, the final Grumman Tracker aircraft flew for the last time leaving Argentine fixed-wing naval aviation without an anti-submarine capability, unless and until another option is found. In June 2022 it was reported that Argentina was seeking to potentially revive the project to purchase the P-3C from the United States since none of the former P-3Bs were operational. However, it was also reported that even if the deal went ahead it would still take time to bring the ex-US Navy P-3Cs back into flying condition in the United States. As a result, work on the P-3B upgrade continued even though, in December 2022, it was reported that the refurbishment of the P-3B was proceeding slower than anticipated and while a revised delivery date of the first upgraded P-3B had been projected for September 2023, that schedule might now face delays. In February 2023 it was reported that Argentina was negotiating with Norway to purchase between three and four of its surplus P-3Cs.

In 2022, the Navy took additional measures to try to retain a viable helicopter fleet by acquiring two additional Sea King helicopters in order to increase overall numbers of operational aircraft of this type. Early in 2023, it was reported that the Navy was also interested in the potential acquisition of additional surplus helicopters from Canada, though it remained to be seen whether such a purchase would be realized.

Air bases

COAN has 5 main airbases (  (BAN) ):
 Comandante Espora (BACE) at Bahía Blanca
 Almirante Zar (BAAZ) at Trelew
 Punta Indio (BAPI) near La Plata
 Almirante Quijada (BARD) at Río Grande, Tierra del Fuego.
 Naval air station Ezeiza (ETAE)  at Ezeiza

Structure

Fuerza Aeronaval 1 (Naval Aviation Force 1)

The Fuerza Aeronaval 1 (FAE1) is based at Punta Indio Naval Air Base, near La Plata, Buenos Aires.

 Escuela de Aviación Naval (ESAN) (Naval Aviation School) : Beechraft T-34C-1Turbo Mentor
 1ra Escuadrilla Aeronaval de Ataque (EA41) (1st Naval Attack Sqd) : In reserve, no aircraft assigned.
 Escuadrilla Aeronaval de Vigilancia Marítima (EA1V) (Maritime Surveillance Naval Sqd) : Beechcraft B200 Cormorán, locally converted for the maritime patrol role. Based at naval air Station Punta Indio (BAPI)
 2da Escuadrilla Aeronaval de Sostén Logístico Móvil (EA52) (2nd naval Transport Sqd) : Based at naval air Station Ezeiza  (ETAE) at Ezeiza International Airport in Buenos Aires, they used Fokker F28 Mk.3000C Fellowship for supporting all navy units. However, reported retired from service without replacement as of 2021.

Fuerza Aeronaval 2 (Naval Aviation Force 2)
The Fuerza Aeronaval 2 (FAE2) is based at navy airbase Comandante Espora, near Bahía Blanca and consists of all embarked aircraft.

2da Escuadrilla Aeronaval de Caza y Ataque (EA32) (2nd naval Fighter/Attack Sqd): Dassault-Breguet Super Étendard
 Escuadrilla Aeronaval Antisubmarina (EA2S) (Antisubmarine naval Sqd) : Grumman/IAI S-2T Turbo Tracker and Pilatus PC-6B2/H2 Turbo Porter (Trackers reported non-operational as of 2021)
 1ra Escuadrilla Aeronaval de Helicópteros (EAH1) (1st naval Helicopters Sqd) : Aérospatiale SA-316B Alouette III and Eurocopter AS-555SN Fennec
 2da Escuadrilla Aeronaval de Helicópteros (EAH2) (2nd naval Helicopters Sqd) : Sikorsky S-61 D4 H-3 Sea King and Agusta AS-61 Sea King
 3ra Escuadrilla Aeronaval de Helicópteros (EAH3) (3rd naval Helicopters Sqd) : Bell UH-1 Iroquois, assigned to the marines – transferred to the army on February 7, 2008.

Fuerza Aeronaval 3 (Naval Aviation Force 3)
The Fuerza Aeronaval Numero 3 (FAE3) is based at Naval Airbase Almirante Zar, near Trelew to perform sea control and Search and rescue duties along the Argentine coast from the Uruguayan border to the Antarctic Peninsula.

 Escuadrilla Aeronaval de Exploración (EA6E) (Exploration naval Sqd) : P-3B reported non-operational at end 2019; Being refurbished as of 2021.

Naval aircraft in service
List excludes non-operational aircraft/aircraft in storage

In addition to the Naval aviation, a small air fleet is maintained by the Argentine Coast Guard.

For aircraft previously operated by the Argentine Navy, see List of aircraft of Argentine Naval Aviation.

See also

Argentine Air Force
Argentine Army Aviation
 Argentine air forces in the Falklands War
 Battle of San Carlos
 List of aircraft of the Argentine Naval Aviation

Footnotes

References 
Portions based on a translation from Spanish Wikipedia.

Citations

Sources

Further reading 
 Aviación Naval Argentina. Sebastian Sequeira, Carlos Cal y Cecilia Calatayud. , SS&CC ediciones, Buenos Aires, 1984. (Spanish text)

External links

 
 Argentine Naval Aviation Institute
 MUAN Official Naval Aviation Museum
 Argentine Naval Aviation in 1934
 Naval Aviation Command, Argentine Navy website  (accessed 2914-08-10)

 
Military units and formations established in 1919